Serp i Molot is a rural locality (a settlement) in Ilyinskoye Rural Settlement, Kolchuginsky District, Vladimir Oblast, Russia. The population was 142 as of 2010. There are 7 streets.

Geography 
Serp i Molot is located 12 km northeast of Kolchugino (the district's administrative centre) by road. Shishlikha is the nearest rural locality.

References 

Rural localities in Kolchuginsky District